Jim Marleau (born 1947) is an American politician from Michigan. A Republican, Marleau 
represented the 12th district of the Michigan Senate from 2011 until 2019.

Early life 
March 18, 1947, Marleau was born in Lake Orion, Michigan.

Education 
Marleau earned an AAS degree in Business/Finance from University of Toledo. Marleau earned a CFMA in Municipal Finance Administration from Central Michigan University.

Career 
Marleau was for many years a businessman. Marleau served as a treasurer in Orion Township, Michigan.

On November 2, 2004, Marleau won the election and became a Republican member of Michigan House of Representatives for District 46. Marleau defeated Daniel Myslakowski with 63.08% of the votes. On November 7, 2006, as an incumbent, Marleau won the election and continued serving District 46. Marleau defeated Bill Pearson with 60.97% of the votes. On November 4, 2008, as an incumbent, Marleau won the election and continued serving District 46. Marleau defeated Katherine Houston 60.57% of the votes.

On November 2, 2010, Marleau won election and became a state senator of Michigan Senate for District 12. Marleau defeated Casandra E. Ulbrich with 60.90% of the votes. On November 4, 2014, as an incumbent, Marleau won the election and continued serving as a state senator for District 12. Marleau defeated Paul Secrest.

Personal life 
Marleau's wife is Thea Marleau. They have two children.

References

External links 
 James Marleau at ballotpedia.org
 James Marleau at ourcampaigns.com
State Senate bio of Marleau

1947 births
Living people
Republican Party members of the Michigan House of Representatives
Republican Party Michigan state senators
People from Oakland County, Michigan
21st-century American politicians